John Hans Krebs (December 17, 1926 – November 10, 2014) was an Israeli-American politician and attorney who served as a U.S. Representative for California's 17th congressional district from 1975 to 1979.

Early life and education
Born in 1926 in Berlin, then in the Weimar Republic (now Germany), Krebs moved to British-mandated Palestine in 1933 and attended Balfour School (elementary), 1937. He graduated from Ben Yehuda College in 1945. As a young man, he volunteered for Haganah, a Jewish paramilitary group that supported the creation of an Israeli state. Afterward, he immigrated to America in 1946 and obtained United States citizenship in 1954. He earned an A.B., University of California at Berkeley in 1950 and an LL.B. from the University of California, Hastings College of the Law in 1957.

Career
He was admitted to the California bar in 1957 and commenced practice in Fresno in 1958. He served in United States Army from 1952 to 1954 and was a translator stationed in Germany. While in the army, he was a corporal in the infantry. Krebs served as a member of the Fresno County Planning Commission from 1965 to 1969 and on the Fresno County Board of Supervisors from 1970 to 1974. He served as delegate, California State Democratic convention, 1966.

Krebs was elected as a Democrat to the Ninety-fourth Congress, defeating four-term Republican Bob Mathias by a 52% to 48% margin.  He served in the Ninety-fourth and Ninety-fifth Congresses (January 3, 1975 – January 3, 1979). 
Because he grew up in the British League of Nations Mandate of Palestine (known as Mandatory Palestine) and held a passport from Mandatory Palestine before emigrating to the United States, Krebs is considered by The Jewish Press to have been the first Palestinian American to serve in Congress. However, other sources, including Haaretz, consider John E. Sununu to have been the first Palestinian American to have served in Congress.

He was an unsuccessful candidate for reelection in 1978 to the Ninety-sixth Congress, losing to Charles Pashayan, Jr. He was a resident of Fresno, California.

Personal life
Krebs died on November 10, 2014, in Fresno, California. The John Krebs Wilderness in Sequoia National Park was named after him in 2009.

See also
List of Jewish members of the United States Congress

References

1926 births
2014 deaths
Jewish American military personnel
California lawyers
County supervisors in California
Haganah members
Israeli emigrants to the United States
Jewish emigrants from Nazi Germany to Mandatory Palestine
Jewish members of the United States House of Representatives
Democratic Party members of the United States House of Representatives from California
People from Fresno, California
United States Army non-commissioned officers
University of California, Berkeley alumni
University of California, Hastings College of the Law alumni
20th-century American politicians
20th-century American lawyers
21st-century American Jews